South Grafton is a suburb of Grafton, New South Wales, taking in most of the area of the city south of the Clarence River. At the time of the 2016 Australian census, South Grafton had a population of 6,068 people, about one-third of Grafton's total population.

History
South Grafton was first settled around the same time as the main Grafton townsite. However, it was not until the opening of the Grafton Bridge in 1932 that a direct road connection was established between the two settlements – previously residents had relied upon a ferry service to cross the Clarence River. In 1896, South Grafton was given its own municipal government under the Municipalities Act 1867. It was known as the South Grafton Municipal District until 1906 and thereafter as the South Grafton Municipality. In 1956, the South Grafton Municipality was merged into the Grafton City Council. This was in turn merged with other local government areas in 2004 to form the current Clarence Valley Council.

Facilities
The Grafton railway station is located in South Grafton. It was known as the South Grafton station until 1976, when the old Grafton station north of the river closed.

South Grafton has two schools: South Grafton High School and South Grafton Public School.

Heritage listings
South Grafton has a number of heritage-listed sites, including:
 North Coast railway: Grafton railway station

Notable residents
Earle Page, Prime Minister of Australia from 7 April 1939 to 26 April 1939, lived in South Grafton from 1904 to 1920, where he ran a private hospital. He was elected to the municipal council in 1914, and was twice elected as mayor, in 1918 and 1919.

References 

Northern Rivers
Clarence Valley Council
Localities in New South Wales
Grafton, New South Wales